Rivez W. M. Reihana (born 25 May 2000) is a New Zealand rugby union player who plays for the  in Super Rugby and  in the Bunnings NPC. His position is fly-half. He was named in the Chiefs squad for the 2021 Super Rugby Aotearoa season.

Reference list

External links
itsrugby.co.uk profile

2000 births
New Zealand rugby union players
Living people
Rugby union fly-halves
Waikato rugby union players
Chiefs (rugby union) players
Northland rugby union players
Rugby union fullbacks